Amphisbaena caiari is a species of worm lizard endemic to Brazil.

References

caiari
Endemic fauna of Brazil
Reptiles of Brazil
Reptiles described in 2014
Taxa named by Mauro Teixeira Jr.
Taxa named by Francisco Dal Vechio
Taxa named by Antonio Mollo Neto
Taxa named by Miguel Trefaut Rodrigues